Hibbertia dealbata is a species of flowering plant in the family Dilleniaceae and is endemic to northern Australia. It is similar to Hibbertia brownii but has lance-shaped to egg-shaped leaves with the lower end towards the base and flattened hairs on the lower surface. The flowers are arranged on the ends of the branchlets.

Hibbertia dealbata was first formally described in 1817 by Augustin Pyramus de Candolle in his Regni Vegetabilis Systema Naturale from an unpublished description by Robert Brown and was given the name Hemistemma dealbatum.  In 1863, George Bentham changed the name to Hibbertia dealbata in Flora Australiensis. Hibbertia dealbata occurs in the northern part of the Northern Territory and in Queensland. It is classified as of "least concern" under the Northern Territory Government Territory Parks and Wildlife Conservation Act 1976 and under the Queensland Government Nature Conservation Act 1992.

See also
List of Hibbertia species

References

complanata
Flora of the Northern Territory
Plants described in 1817
Taxa named by Augustin Pyramus de Candolle